Hyatt Regency Houston is a 30-story high-rise hotel located in downtown Houston, Texas, United States.

The hotel, part of the Hyatt hotel chain, was designed by architectural firm JV III ( a joint venture between firms Caudill Rowlett Scott, Neuhaus & Taylor, and Koetter, Tharp & Cowell)  and was opened to guests in 1972. At 401 ft (122 m), Hyatt Regency Houston is the city's tallest hotel  The hotel is topped by a revolving restaurant known as "Spindletop". The hotel's 29-story atrium, one of the highest in Texas, was featured as a set in the 1976 film Logan's Run.

Hyatt Regency Houston was a host hotel for the 1992 Republican National Convention, the 16th G7 Economic Summit in 1990, and the 1998 World Energy Congress. The hotel completed a $40 million renovation in 2008 that included all 947 guestrooms, a redesigned lobby bar,  of meeting space, and the addition of the only Shula's Steakhouse in Texas.

See also

Architecture of Houston
List of tallest buildings in Houston

Notes

External links
Hyatt Regency Houston website

Buildings and structures with revolving restaurants
Hyatt Hotels and Resorts
Hotel buildings completed in 1972
Hotels established in 1972
Skyscraper hotels in Houston